The 2022 Czech Women's Curling Championship was held in Prague from March 3 to 8, 2022.

Four teams took part in the championship. 

The team "Liboc 3" skipped this time by Alžběta Baudyšová won the championship (Baudyšová won her seventh title as player and first as skip).

The 2022 Czech Men's Curling Championship was held simultaneously with this championship at the same arena.

Teams

Round robin
Three best teams to playoffs: first team to final "best of 3" series, 2nd and 3rd teams to semifinal.

  Teams to playoffs

Playoffs

Semifinal
6 March, 18:00 UTC+1

Final ("best of 3" series)
Game 1. 7 March, 11:00

Game 2. 7 March, 18:00

Game 2. 8 March, 18:00

Final standings

References

See also
2022 Czech Men's Curling Championship
2022 Czech Mixed Doubles Curling Championship

2020
Czech Women's Curling Championship
Curling Women's Championship
Czech Women's Curling Championship
Sports competitions in Prague
2020s in Prague
2022 in Czech women's sport
2022 in women's curling